Pavitra Bhagya is an Indian romantic drama television series produced by Ekta Kapoor under Balaji Telefilms. It aired from 2 March 2020 to 2 October 2020 on Colors TV and starred Aneri Vajani, Kunal Jaisingh, Vaishnavi Prajapati and Riva Arora.

Plot 

The story is about college-mates Pranati Mishra and Reyansh Khurana who fall in love but go their separate ways when Reyansh learns that Pranati is pregnant. Pranati has a daughter. Shobha sends the baby to an orphanage. Eight years later, Pranati learns about the existence of her daughter, Jugnu, and she and Reyansh are given her joint custody for six months. Pranati moves into the Khurana house where the story continues along few sub-plots such as the mystery of the death behind Reyansh's mother, Riya and Armaan's Love Story, the custody battle of Jugnu, Archit and Navya sibling relations, Jugnu's kidnapping, the evil intentions of elder brother Vardhan and Mallika who wants to marry Reyansh. On Pranati's birthday, Reyansh's family has to move back to their old house because Vardhan has been sent to jail. Pranati and Reyansh do the pooja in the old house where the story ends off with Reyansh asking Pranathi inside his head to marry him and Pranati responds saying yes in her head.

Cast

Main
 Aneri Vajani as Pranati Mishra Khurana – Shobhna and Madan's elder daughter; Prabhas and Chetna's sister; Archit's ex-fiancée; Reyansh's wife; Jugnu's mother
 Kunal Jaisingh as Reyansh Khurana – Shamsher and Anjana's younger son; Vardhan's brother; Armaan and Maan's cousin; Pranati's husband; Jugnu's father
 Vaishnavi Prajapati / Riva Arora as Jugnu Khurana – Pranati and Reyansh's daughter

Recurring
 Vibha Chibber as Baljeet Khurana – Shamsher and Sangram's mother; Vardhan, Reyansh, Armaan and Maan's grandmother; Jugnu's great-grandmother
 Sherrin Varghese as Shamsher Khurana – Baljeet's elder son; Sangram's brother; Anjana's husband; Vardhan and Reyansh's father; Jugnu's grandfather
 Anjali Gupta as Anjana Khurana – Shamsher's wife; Vardhan and Reyansh's mother; Jugnu's grandmother
 Bhavya Sachdeva as Vardhan Khurana – Shamsher and Anjana's elder son; Reyansh's brother; Armaan and Maan's cousin; Anisha's husband
 Charu Mehra as Anisha Khurana – Vardhan's wife
 Jaideep Singh as Sangram Khurana – Baljeet's younger son; Shamsher's brother; Bindiya's husband; Armaan and Maan's father
 Roma Bali as Bindiya Khurana – Sangram's wife; Armaan and Maan's mother
 Mohit Hiranandini as Armaan Khurana – Bindiya and Sangram's elder son; Maan's brother; Vardhan and Reyansh's cousin; Navya's ex-lover; Riya's husband
 Prema Mehta as Riya Gehlot Khurana – Vishambar's daughter; Sameer's sister; Armaan's wife 
 Yatin Mehta as Maan Khurana – Bindiya and Sangram's younger son; Armaan's brother; Vardhaan and Reyansh's cousin; Navya's love-interest
 Ajay Chakraborty as Madan Mishra – Shobhna's husband; Prabhas, Pranati and Chetna's father; Jugnu's grandfather
 Ruma Rajni as Shobhna Mishra – Madan's wife; Prabhas, Pranati and Chetna's mother; Jugnu's grandmother
 Pratiksha Rai as Chetna Mishra – Shobhna and Madan's younger daughter; Prabhas and Pranati's sister
 Jatin Shah as Prabhas Mishra – Shobhna and Madan's son; Pranati and Chetna's brother; Pallavi's husband
 Piyali Munshi as Pallavi Mishra – Prabhas's wife
 Abhishek Verma as Archit Ahuja – Mr. Ahuja and Sumitra's son; Navya and Nupur's brother; Pranati's ex-fiancé 
 Vibha Bhagat / Divyajyotee Sharama as Sumitra Ahuja – Mr. Ahuja's wife; Archit, Navya and Nupur's mother 
 Karan Sharma as Mr. Ahuja – Sumitra's husband; Archit, Navya and Nupur's father 
 Avantika Choudhary as Navya Ahuja – Mr. Ahuja and Sumitra's elder daughter; Archit and Nupur's sister; Armaan's ex-lover; Maan's love-interest 
 Ruby Bharaj as Nupur Ahuja – Mr. Ahuja and Sumitra's younger daughter; Archit and Navya's sister
 Param Nagar as Dilsher Singh – Reyansh's best friend 
 Aashish Kaul as Vishambhar Gehlot – Riya and Sameer's father 
 Vidyut Xavier as Sameer Gehlot – Vishambhar's son; Riya's brother; Mallika's fiancé 
 Neha Pednekar as Mallika – Mantri's daughter; Reyansh's ex-lover; Sameer's fiancée
 Karan Taneja as Matron's assistant

Production

Development
The series was mainly filmed at the sets in Killick Nixon studio.

The production and airing of the show was halted indefinitely in late March 2020 due to the COVID-19 outbreak in India. Because of the outbreak, the filming of the series was halted on 19 March 2020. After three months, the filming resumed and new episodes started airing from 13 July 2020. Vaishnavi Prajapati was replaced by Riva Arora as Jugnu.

On 12 July 2020, the filming of the series was halted for a few days when Parth Samthaan from Kasautii Zindagii Kay, filmed at the same studio, was tested positive for COVID-19.

Cancellation and future
Post COVID-19 break, when the series resumed in July, it had a drastic ratings drop and the show was abruptly ended on 2 October 2020 midway despite having a bank of 12 episodes.
Pavitra Bhagya was scheduled to come back with season 2 post Bigg Boss 14. In January 2021, Bigg Boss 14 Was extended till February 2021 which lead to the cancellation of Pavitra Bhagya 2.

Reception
The Times of India quoted that Aneri Vajani and Kunal Jaisingh's show looks promising; child actor Vaishnavi Prajapati steals the limelight and said, "Jugnu in Pavitra Bhagya stands out as a child actor. Sporting a tomboy look, Jugnu’s level of naughtiness and attitude is level: Boss. With a fresh cast, the storyline of Pavitra Bhagya is also interesting and promising. However, Aneri’s Pranati is a bit over the top when it comes to showing her emotional moments. Abhishek’s character Archit is also quite progressive and we can see in the upcoming episodes if his role stays the same. Kunal Jaisingh is good with the casanova image and he is justifying his role as Reyansh aka Rey."

References

External links
  on Colors

Balaji Telefilms television series
2020 Indian television series debuts
Indian drama television series
Colors TV original programming
Hindi-language television shows
Indian romance television series